Vágs Kappróðrarfelag (Vágur Rowing Club) is a Faroese rowing club from Vágur in Suðuroy, which was founded in July 1943.

Boats for Rowing Competitions 

Every summer there are several rowing competitions around the islands, starting with the Norðoyastevna in Klaksvík and ending in Tórshavn at the Ólavsøka on 28 July. Vágs Kappróðrarfelag has boats in different sizes.
There are competitions for different categories: The children have their own rowing competitions in 5-mannafar. Boys U-18 in 5-mannafar, Girls U-18 in 5-mannafar, Women in 5-mannafar, Men in 6-mannafar, Men in 8-mannafar and Men in 10-mannafar.

The Boats of Vágs Kappróðrarfelag 

10-mannafar - Boats for 10 Rowers

 Vágbingur - Built in 1968 by boat builder Niclas í Koltri
 Vágbingur, built in 2000, by Kaj Hammer
 Vágbingur, (prior Kjølur from Kollafjørður, brought to Vágur ín 2005. The boat was built in 1997; it was the first boat which boat builder Sámal Hansen built.

8-mannafar - Boats for 8 Rowers

 Toftaregin, built in 1934. It was in bad shape some years ago. It was restored by Jóannes í Ósagarð and Asbjørn Muller from Vágur.

6-mannafar - Boats for 6 Rowers

 Smyril, built in 2003 by boat builder Sámal Hansen.

5-mannafar - Boats for 6 Rowers
5-mannafar has the same number of rowers, but the boats are smaller than 6-mannafar.

 Royndin Fríða, built in 1998 by Kaj Hammer.
 Royndin Fríða, built in 2004 by Sámal Hansen.

Faroese Champions 
Rowing is a very old tradition in the Faroe Islands, and rowing competitions go back a long time. But in the old days it was more for fun and not organized in competitions. In 1973 the regular rowing competitions, which are called Faroese Championships in Rowing (FM) started in the Faroe Islands. The Faroese name for these competitions is FM, short for Føroyameistaraheitið. Since 1973 Vágs Kappróðrarfelag has won 5 Faroese Championships:

 1980 Vágbingur, 10-mannafør for men.
 1982 Smyril, 6-mannafør for women.
 1994 Royndin Fríða, 5-mannafør for boys.
 2002 Smyril, 6-mannafør for men.
 2003 Smyril, 6-mannafør for men.

References

External links 
 RSF.fo
 Drekin.fo

Suðuroy
Sports clubs established in 1943
Faroe Islands
Sport in Vágur